(The) Unguarded Moment may refer to:

 The Unguarded Moment (film), a 1956 film starring George Nader, Esther Williams, John Saxon
 "The Unguarded Moment" (song), sung by The Church from album Of Skins and Heart
 "The Unguarded Moment", an episode of the Canadian series The Bridge
 Unguarded Moment, a novel by Sara Craven